is a 1995 racing video game developed by Media Rings for the Super Famicom, and is the sequel to Zero4 Champ RR.

Summary

Vehicle manufacturers in the game include Honda, Mazda, Mitsubishi, Mitsuoka, Nissan, Subaru, and Toyota.

This game is an anime-style racing video game with an extensive simulation mode.Similar in premise to the Rocky III movie, the 18-year-old that the player controlled in Zero Champ RR became the champion of the Japanese Drag Racing World but was insulted. As a result, he moved to a new city to start his drag racing career over from scratch. Automatic transmission is now included but has a 0.5 second stall time between changing gears.

There are three options on the title screen; the full story (involving the 18-year-old driver pursuing his dreams), a versus mode (allowing players to use all the automobiles available in the game), and a mini-story mode that allows players to play on episodic matches in selected high-priced racing vehicles (some of them costing almost one billion yen).

References

1995 video games
Japan-exclusive video games
Racing video games
Super Nintendo Entertainment System games
Super Nintendo Entertainment System-only games
Video games about time travel
Video game sequels
Multiplayer and single-player video games
Video games developed in Japan